British NVC community MG2 (Arrhenatherum elatius- Filipendula ulmaria tall-herb grassland) is one of the mesotrophic grassland communities in the British National Vegetation Classification system.

It is a localised community found only in northern England. There are two subcommunities.


Community composition

The following constant species are found in this community:
 Wild Angelica (Angelica sylvestris)
 False Oat-grass (Arrhenatherum elatius)
 Crosswort (Cruciata laevipes)
 Cock's-foot (Dactylis glomerata)
 Male Fern (Dryopteris filix-mas)
 Broad-leaved Willowherb (Epilobium montanum)
 Red Fescue (Festuca rubra)
 Meadowsweet (Filipendula ulmaria)
 Water Avens (Geum rivale)
 Common Hogweed (Heracleum sphondylium)
 Dog's Mercury (Mercurialis perennis)
 Rough Meadow-grass (Poa trivialis)
 Red Campion (Silene dioica)
 Stinging Nettle (Urtica dioica)
 Common Valerian (Valeriana officinalis)
 Swartz's Feather-moss (Eurhynchium swartzii)
 Hart's-tongue Thyme-moss (Plagiomnium undulatum)
 Dented Silk-moss (Plagiothecium denticulatum)
 Bifid Crestwort (Lophocolea bidentata sensu lato)

One rare species, Jacob's-ladder (Polemonium caeruleum), is associated with this community.

Distribution

This community is confined to a small number of localities in northern England - in Derbyshire, Craven and the Cheviots.

Subcommunities

There are two subcommunities: 
 the Filipendula ulmaria subcommunity
 the Polemonium caeruleum subcommunity

References

 Rodwell, J. S. (1992) British Plant Communities Volume 3 - Grasslands and montane communities  (hardback),  (paperback)

MG02